Lyndon Baines Johnson (LBJ) Early College High School is a public high school in northeast Austin, Texas. At the time of its opening in 1974, LBJ was only the second high school in the U.S. (after the former Johnson City High School) to be named for the 36th President. In 1985, LBJ became the host of a new academic magnet program, the Science Academy of Austin (SA), which drew students from all over the city. A second high school magnet program, the Liberal Arts Academy of Austin (LAA), was opened at Albert Sidney Johnston High School in 1987; the two programs were merged in 2002, forming the Liberal Arts and Science Academy (LASA) magnet within LBJ. In 2007, the Austin Independent School District split LASA and LBJ into separate high schools with their own principals, faculty, and staff in order for LBJ to be eligible for a grant from the Bill & Melinda Gates Foundation to implement the "First Things First" educational enrichment program. After the split, LBJ and LASA were housed on the same campus (though largely on different floors) and continued to share athletic teams and certain extracurricular activities and electives (band, theater, newspaper, yearbook, choir, orchestra, etc.) until LASA's relocation. In 2011, via a partnership with the Austin Community College, LBJ established a new program through which students could earn up to 60 college credits while still in high school, earning it the "Early College High School" (ECHS) designation it bears today. In 2021, LASA relocated to the former Eastside Memorial Early College High School campus.

LBJ Early College High School's mascot is the Jaguar, and the school's colors are purple and white.

The principal of LBJ Early College High School is Dr. Joseph Welch. Patrick Patterson, who had been at the school since the 2004-2005 school year as part of the high school campus redesign program initiated to help raise TAKS scores, retired after the 2009-2010 school year. As a result of the split, LASA and LBJ are required to have separate principals.

From 2007 to 2021, the school occupied the first floor of its campus, while LASA was on the second floor. Melissa B. Taboada of the Austin American-Statesman stated that some members of the Austin community "say the division [was] a constant blemish on the campus".

Student body
As of November 2020, LBJ's student body is 33.4% African American, 63.1% Hispanic, and 3.5% other racial groups. 73.9% of students are economically disadvantaged.

Academic performance
In 2015 Taboada stated "LBJ has struggled academically for years."

Campus 
The LBJ campus opened in Northeast Austin in 1974 to relieve overcrowding at the nearby Northeast Early College High School (then known as Reagan High School.) The school went through various renovations in summer 2010, funded by AISD's 2008 bond, including remodeling many of the science labs (at the time used by LASA.) The school's theatre is located in a separate building from the rest of the campus; the building is named the Don T. Haynes III Performing Arts Center, after LBJ's band director for 39 years from 1975 to 2014. As LBJ is built upon a hill, the lowest level of the main school building is partially underground and has no windows. It is fondly referred to as "The Dungeon" throughout campus. The outside of the campus is maintained by a volunteer group of students and parents. 

The most well known feature on the LBJ campus is "The Texas," a large granite statue in the shape of the state's outline. The statue, a gift from the class of 1978, sits outside the front of the school. In 2002, a group of seniors started a Northeast-LBJ tradition by wrapping the Texas in saran wrap to protect it from vandals. The night before the annual Northeast-LBJ football game, seniors wrap the Texas in saran wrap and spend the night keeping it and other parts of the campus safe from vandalism by students of their rival Northeast High School.

Notable people
John M. Jackson (social studies faculty 1975–1979), actor (Adm. Chegwidden on "JAG", and many other television and movie roles)
Chris Houston, NFL player
Ray Jackson (Class of 1991), member of the Michigan "Fab 5" star freshman basketball players
Kerry Hyder, Dallas Cowboys and Texas Tech player
Eric Holle, NFL player
Marshall Brown, professional basketball player
Quinlan Aquirre McAfee (Quin NFN), rapper
Chris Lowe and Scott Romig (class of 1989), who comprise 40% of the band Dexter Freebish

See also
Liberal Arts and Science Academy (LASA) - LASA and LBJ students shared the same campus, newspaper, yearbook, band, theatre, orchestra, choir, and many other curricular or extracurricular programs from 2007 to 2021.

References

External links
Liberal Arts and Science Academy at LBJ High School
Austin Independent School District: LBJ High School

Educational institutions established in 1974
Magnet schools in Texas
High schools in Austin, Texas
Austin Independent School District high schools
1974 establishments in Texas